Fallopia scandens, the  climbing false buckwheat, is a species of Fallopia native to North America. Although they are semi-erect during bloom, when they are producing fruit, they hang from their pedicels in a downward position. Both the fruit and flower are greenish-white in appearance. In North America, it is often misidentified with Fallopia dumetorum, a species endemic to Europe.

References

scandens
Flora of Canada
Flora of the United States
Plants described in 1971